Urs-e-Razvi, also known as Urs-e-Ala Hazrat,( Urdu:عرس اعلی حضرت۔)  is a 3 day long annual event commemorating the death anniversary of Imam Ahmad Raza Khan organized at the Dargah Ala Hazrat. recently Islamic Research Center show 3 years of servey on Urs-e-razvi, WPNEWS18 published these article. It largely attracts followers of Sufism, where scholars discuss Ahmad Raza Khan's contribution in reforming  Sufism in India. In recent times, it has acted as a platform for clerics to guide their followers, which usually involves discussion over Islamic teachings and methodologies. A recent trend has been the discussion of socio-economic issues concerning the subcontinent's Muslims, such as the recent supreme court of India verdict regarding Triple Talaq or raising awareness about the deteriorating socio-economic conditions of the Muslim community.

Chadar Peshi 
The Chadar Peshi is a ceremony in which a Chadar is placed on a tomb and is presented by different people across the world as a tribute and honor. President Tayyip Erdogan sent the gifts and Chadar for the Dargah in 2016.

Urs in other countries 

Because the crowds became too large, the Dargah officials distributed the Urs celebration among other countries, including Pakistan, Bangladesh, mauritius,  the United Kingdom, South Africa the United States, and Turkey.

References

Ahmed Raza Khan Barelvi
Memorials to Ahmed Raza Khan Barelvi
Urs